The Sun Fast 17 is a French trailerable sailboat that was designed by Jacek Centkowski as a cruiser and first built in 1994.

The boat is part of the Sun Fast sailboat range and was developed into the Balt 17.

Production
The design was built by Jeanneau in France, from 1994 to 1999, with about 300 boats completed, but it is now out of production.

Design
The Sun Fast 17 is a recreational keelboat, built predominantly of fiberglass, with wood trim. It has a 3/4 fractional sloop rig, with a keel-stepped mast, a single set of swept spreaders and aluminum spars with continuous stainless steel wire rigging. The hull has a slightly raked stem, a walk-through reverse transom, a transom-hung rudder controlled by a tiller and a retractable centerboard. It displaces  and carries  of cast iron ballast.

The boat is normally fitted with a small  outboard motor for docking and maneuvering.

The design has sleeping accommodation for four people, with a double "V"-berth in the bow cabin and two straight settees in the main cabin and an aft cabin with a double berth on the port side.

For sailing downwind the design may be equipped with a asymmetrical spinnaker of  flown from a retractable bowsprit.

Operational history
The boat was at one time supported by a class club that organized racing events, the Sun Fast Association.

See also
List of sailing boat types

References

External links

Keelboats
1990s sailboat type designs
Sailing yachts
Trailer sailers
Sailboat type designs by Jacek Centkowski
Sailboat types built by Jeanneau